Michael or Mike Peters may refer to:

 Mike Peters (cartoonist) (born 1943), American cartoonist
 Michael Peters (choreographer) (1948–1994), American choreographer
 Michael Peters (education academic) (born 1948), professor of education
 Mike Peters (musician) (born 1959), Welsh singer, musician and songwriter with The Alarm
 Mike Peters, drummer with Cancer Bats
 Michael Peters (designer), British designer
 Michael Peters (psychologist), Canadian psychologist
 Michael Scott Peters, American official of the United Nations
 Mike Peters, a character in the 1996 film Swingers, portrayed by Jon Favreau